Quick is a small unincorporated community in Kanawha County, West Virginia, United States. It is located along Indian Creek Road (County Route 49). The community is where Whitoak Fork and Blue Creek come together and meet. It is also where the abandoned railroad that follows Blue Creek joins the road, and follows it all the way to the community of Hitop, along Pond Fork. Its post office  is closed.

The community includes a church and community center, and a few other small community places.

Quick Community Center was originally a junior high school in the 1940s.  In the early 1960s, Quick Junior High became Quick Elementary and it housed students from grades 1 to 3.  In the early 1980s the elementary school was closed.  It was a few years afterward that the build was utilized as a community center.

Quick Road was built and upgraded during the Great Depression by the WPA Program.

Etymology

Quick most likely was named after the local Quick family.  Some members of the Quick family are buried at Quick Community Cemetery.

References 

Unincorporated communities in West Virginia
Unincorporated communities in Kanawha County, West Virginia
Coal towns in West Virginia